The Persian Gulf Pro League clubs in the AFC Champions League.This details the participation and performances in the competition since its based at 2002 as a result of the merger between the Asian Club Championship, the Asian Cup Winners' Cup and the Asian Super Cup.

Participations
GS : Group Stage, R16 : Round of 16, QF : Quarter-Finals, SF : Semi-Finals, RU : Runners-Up, W : Winners, TBD : To Be Decided

Statistics

Statistics by club 
This table includes results beyond group stage of the AFC Champions League through 2002/03 season, therefore:
 It does not include the old Asian Club Championship
It does not include Qualifying rounds

 (After 2022 Group Stage)

Statistics by season 
As of Oct.19, 2021

Finals

Top scorers

Bold Active in Iranian league teams

Asian Club Championships (1967-2002)

 1969 Asian Champion Club Tournament: 2,1,1 / 8-3 +5
 1970 Asian Champion Club Tournament: 4,0,0 / 10-1 +9
 1971 Asian Champion Club Tournament: 3,1,2 / 10-8 +2
 1986 Asian Club Championship: 2,1,0 / 20-1 +19
 1988–89 Asian Club Championship: 1,0,1 / 6-4 +2
 1989–90 Asian Club Championship: 4,0,2 / 13-7 +6
 1990–91 Asian Club Championship: 5,0,2 / 11-4 +7
 1991 Asian Club Championship: 2,3,1 / 9-4 +5
 1992–93 Asian Club Championship: 3,1,2 / 8-6 +2
 1993–94 Asian Club Championship: 2,2,0 / 4-1 +3
 1994–95 Asian Club Championship: 0,2,0 / 3-3 0
 1995 Asian Club Championship: 3,2,2 / 6-5 +1
 1996–97 Asian Club Championship: 5,1,3 / 17-12 +5
 1997–98 Asian Club Championship: 3,2,2 / 6-7 -1
 1998–99 Asian Club Championship: 4,1,2 / 11-8 +3
 1999–2000 Asian Club Championship: 3,3,1 / 5-2 +3
 2000–01 Asian Club Championship: 5,3,1 / 19-8 +11
 2001–02 Asian Club Championship: 4,1,2 / 19-12 +7

Total: 103 M 55 W, 24 D, 24 L / 185-96 +89

Afro-Asian Club Championship
1993: 0,1,1 0-2 -2

Asian Super Cup
no match.

Asian Cup Winners' Cup
 1990–91 Asian Cup Winners' Cup: 4,2,0 / 15-2 +13
 1991–92 Asian Cup Winners' Cup: 0,2,0 / 1-1 0
 1992–93 Asian Cup Winners' Cup: 3,4,1 / 8-5 +3
 1993–94 Asian Cup Winners' Cup: 1,1,2 / 4-5 -1
 1994–95 Asian Cup Winners' Cup: 1,2,1 / 2-2 0
 1995 Asian Cup Winners' Cup: 1,2,1 / 4-4 0
 1996–97 Asian Cup Winners' Cup: 2,2,2 / 6-6 0
 1997–98 Asian Cup Winners' Cup: 0,1,1 / 2-3 -1
 1998–99 Asian Cup Winners' Cup: 1,1,2 / 11-5 +6
 1999–2000 Asian Cup Winners' Cup: 2,1,1 / 16-2 +14
 2000–01 Asian Cup Winners' Cup: 4,1,3 / 15-10 +5
 2001–02 Asian Cup Winners' Cup: 0,2,0 / 2-2 0

Total: 54 M 19 W, 21 D, 14 L / 86-47 +39

See also 
 Australian clubs in the AFC Champions League
 Chinese clubs in the AFC Champions League
 Indian football clubs in Asian competitions
 Indonesian football clubs in Asian competitions
 Iraqi clubs in the AFC Champions League
 Japanese clubs in the AFC Champions League
 Myanmar clubs in the AFC Champions League
 Qatari clubs in the AFC Champions League
 Saudi Arabian clubs in the AFC Champions League
 South Korean clubs in the AFC Champions League
 Thai clubs in the AFC Champions League
 Vietnamese clubs in the AFC Champions League

References

 AFC Champions League Official website
 AFC Champions League on RSSSF

Football in Iran
Iranian football clubs in international competitions
Football clubs in the AFC Champions League